Valentinos Vlachos (born 14 February 1992) is a Greek professional footballer who plays as a right-back.

Club career
Valentinos Vlachos started his professional career in Kavala. In 2011, he signed a three-year contract with Greek giant club AEK Athens. Immediately he signed on a loan from the club with Thrasyvoulos playing in Football League. After a fruitful year in the second league, he returned to AEK Athens playing for the 2012–13 season.

In June 2013, the Greek midfielder Valentinos Vlachos  was very interested in the idea of joining Club Brugge due to the bankruptcy of his former club AEK Athens which relegated for first time in its history.
After six months, in January 2014, Club Brugge formalized the loan rights for Valentinos Vlachos until the end of the season at Aris. Greek player arrived last summer from AEK Athens as a free transfer. Vlachos is the second Greek player authorized to return home after Spyros Fourlanos, who arrived last May from Panathinaikos. Both players have not played any league match. On 31 December 2014 Valentinos Vlachos signed a one and half years' contract with the Greek side club Panionios.

On 18 May 2018, only details are now remaining for the transfer move of Greek midfielder, who made an excellent season with Panionios, to ambitious Asteras Tripolis. The 26-year-old right midfielder will replace Manolis Bertos in the squad of experienced manager Savvas Pantelidis' team ahead of 2018–19 season. A day later he signed a two years' contract for an undisclosed fee.

Career statistics

Club

References

External links

Onsports.gr Profile

1992 births
Living people
Greece under-21 international footballers
Greek expatriate footballers
Kavala F.C. players
AEK Athens F.C. players
Thrasyvoulos F.C. players
Club Brugge KV players
Aris Thessaloniki F.C. players
Asteras Tripolis F.C. players
Super League Greece players
Football League (Greece) players
Belgian Pro League players
Expatriate footballers in Belgium
Association football defenders
Footballers from Athens
Greek footballers